Oxyrhopus formosus (vernacular names: beautiful calico snake, Formosa false coral snake) is a neotropical snake of the family Dipsadidae. Its distribution is not fully understood, because of inaccurate identifications and confusion with other Oxyrhopus species. It has been reported from Brazil, Colombia, and Peru. Reports from the Guiana region are based on misidentified O. occipitalis. Oxyrhopus formosus are robust, the head is entirely yellow, and adults are red with prominent black bands; O. occipitalis are slender, the snout is yellow and the top of head is brown, and adults are red with faint crossbands.

References

Oxyrhopus
Snakes of South America
Reptiles of Brazil
Reptiles of Colombia
Reptiles of Peru
Taxa named by Prince Maximilian of Wied-Neuwied
Reptiles described in 1820